The Chinese-American Chemical Society (CACS) is an organization of Chinese chemists and chemical engine who work in America. CACS was founded in 1981 and has 300 members. It works in cooperation with the American Chemical Society.

References 
 "Silver anniversary for Chinese society" by Linda Wang. C&EN May 1, 2006, page 37.

External links
 CACS homepage

Chemistry societies
Scientific societies based in the United States
Organizations established in 1981
Chinese-American organizations
1981 establishments in the United States